Colombari is an Italian surname. Notable people with the surname include:

Diego Colombari (born 1982), Italian cyclist
Enrico Colombari (1905–1983), Italian footballer and manager
F. Colombari, Italian military officer and painter
Martina Colombari (born 1975), Italian actress, model and television presenter

Italian-language surnames